Pan Wuyun (born March 1943) is a leading Chinese linguist and specialist in historical Chinese phonology.

Career
Pan was born in Rui'an, Zhejiang in 1943. After graduating from high school, he was unable to attend college because of his family background and worked as a labourer in several Wenzhou factories. After the end of the Cultural Revolution, he tested into the graduate program of Fudan University in 1979, and earned his master's degree in Chinese language in 1982. He subsequently taught at Wenzhou Normal College before becoming a professor at Shanghai Normal University. He also taught as a visiting professor at the University of California, Berkeley, the University of Wisconsin, the University of Oslo, the City University of Hong Kong, the Chinese University of Hong Kong, and the National Tsing Hua University.

Research areas
The strong point of Pan's research and teaching is the historical phonology of Old Chinese, Middle Chinese, and Chinese dialectology.

Works
Dongfang Wenhua yǔyán yǔ: Dunhuang zīliào 东方语言与文化:敦煌资料. Dongfang chūbǎn zhongxin 东方出版中心, Shanghai 2002, .
Hànyǔ lìshǐ yīnyùnxué "汉语历史音韵学". Shànghǎi Jiaoyu chūbǎnshè 上海教育出版社 2000, .
Pan Wùyún zìxuǎnjí "潘悟云自选集" Anhui Jiaoyu chūbǎnshè 安徽教育出版社, Hefei, 2002, .

Translations
Yuánshǐ Hànyǔ yǔ zàngyǔ "原始汉语与汉藏语" ( Nicholas C. Bodman : Proto-Chinese and Sino-Tibetan), Zhonghua Shuju中华书局, Beijing 1995,  (with Feng Zheng冯蒸).
Shànggǔ Hànyǔ de fǔyīn xìtǒng上古汉语的辅音系统. Zhonghua Shuju中华书局, Beijing 1999,  ( Edwin G. Pulleyblank : The consonantal system of Old Chinese, together with Xu Wénkān徐文堪).
Han wén diǎn 汉文典. Shànghǎi císhū chūbǎnshè上海辞书出版社1997,  (Bernhard Karlgren: Grammata Serica).

References

1943 births
Living people
Linguists from China
Chinese phonologists
People from Rui'an
Fudan University alumni
University of California, Berkeley faculty
University of Wisconsin–Madison faculty
Academic staff of the University of Oslo
Academic staff of the City University of Hong Kong
Academic staff of the Chinese University of Hong Kong
Writers from Wenzhou
Academic staff of Shanghai Normal University
Scientists from Wenzhou
20th-century linguists
21st-century linguists
Educators from Wenzhou